Net gain may refer to:
 Net gain (telecommunications), the overall gain of a transmission circuit.
 Net (economics)
 Net profit
 Net income